Dallas Cowboys Cheerleaders: Making the Team is an American reality television series that premiered in 2006 on CMT. The series follows the auditioning process and the forming of the Dallas Cowboys' annual Cheerleading squad. The series features director Kelli McGonagill Finglass and choreographer Judy Trammell.

After 16 seasons on CMT, CMT announced that they would not renew the show for a 17th season. Despite this, the Dallas Cowboys organization, and the show production company, are working together to reach an agreement with a new platform for the show to stream on for future seasons.

Summary

The show tracks the progression of women who are in the audition process of trying to become a Dallas Cowboys Cheerleader. The show begins at Texas Stadium (Seasons 1–3), then moves with the team to AT&T Stadium in subsequent seasons: first the open audition "cattle call", then the five-person audition "cut-down", followed by personal interviews, uniform fittings, BMI testing, physical fitness testing, etiquette training, mock media interviews, and calendar shoots. Successful candidates must also complete a knowledge test on various subjects including, but not limited to: the Dallas Cowboys and their history, NFL Football in general and the rules of the game, general history, government, and current events. There is also the grueling elite dance choreography that tests each girl's capacity to grasp dance combinations and perform the trademark kick-line/jump-split routine for which the Dallas Cowboys Cheerleaders is known. Girls are judged by a hand-picked panel of experts, and scoring is based on physical appearance, physical fitness, dance style, poise, grace, intelligence, and showmanship. Once training camp opens, the girls are put through a program of elite dance training and physical conditioning that is comparable to some professional sports training programs. If a girl is struggling, she is called into Finglass' office to discuss the nature of her difficulty and is generally given an opportunity to correct the shortcoming(s) to avoid being dismissed ("cut") from the squad. Due to Covid protocols, auditions went virtual in 2020, and have remained so through the current year.

Cast
Note: Cheerleaders in bold indicate legacy cheerleaders (i.e. mother was previously a Dallas Cowboys cheerleader). Cheerleaders in italics indicate (first) group leaders.

2022 season 
While the show did not run for the 2022 season, this season shall be included as a filler in the event the show is later renewed. 
2022–23 Squad

2021 season (Season 16)
2021–22 Squad

2020 season (Season 15)
2020–21 Squad

2019 season (Season 14)
2019–20 Squad

2018 season (Season 13)
2018–19 Squad

2017 season (Season 12)
2017-18 Squad

2016 season (Season 11)
2016–17 Squad

2015 season (Season 10)
2015–16 Squad

2014 season (Season 9)
2014–15 Squad

2013 season (Season 8)
2013–14 Squad

2012 season (Season 7)
2012–13 Squad

2011 season (Season 6)
2011–12 Squad

2010 season (Season 5)
2010–11 Squad

2009 season (Season 4)
2009–10 Squad

2008 season (Season 3)
2008–09 Squad

2007 season (Season 2)
2007–08 Squad

2006 season (Season 1)
2006–07 Squad

2005 season (Pilot)
2005–06 Squad

Cheerleaders (by tenure)

References

"Why America Can't Quit the Dallas Cowboys Cheerleaders", The Daily Beast

External links
 Official site at CMT.com
 

2000s American reality television series
2010s American reality television series
2020s American reality television series
2006 American television series debuts
Cheerleading television series
CMT (American TV channel) original programming
Dallas Cowboys
American sports television series
Television shows set in Dallas
Women in Dallas